Dizaj-e Qorban (also Romanized as Dīzaj-e Qorbān and Dīzajqorbān) is a village in Harzandat-e Gharbi Rural District, in the Central District of Marand County, East Azerbaijan Province, Iran. At the 2006 census, its population was 957, in 262 families.

References 

Populated places in Marand County